Eynelli is a village in Çamardı district of Niğde Province, Turkey. It is situated in northern slopes of the Toros Mountains. The population of the village is  1017  as of 2011. The village is at the north of Çamardı.

References

Çamardı towns and villages